Tamara Dragičević (born 30 March 1989) is a Serbian actress and model. She is the best known for her performances in the film  Montevideo, God Bless You! by Dragan Bjelogrlić and the RTS series The Scent of Rain in the Balkans by Ljubiša Samardžić.

Personal life 
Dragičević has two siblings, a brother and a sister. She is a graduate of the University of Dramatic Arts in Belgrade. She is married to Serbian actor Petar Benčina. She gave birth to daughter Staša on 4 December 2016 and son Lazar on 14 August 2019. They are a popular celebrity couple in Serbia. Her  brother-in-law is actor Igor Benčina.

Career 
Dragičević landed the role in Montevideo, God Bless You!, the upcoming film of Dragan Bjelogrlić, in late 2009. The film premiered on 20 December 2010 in the Sava Centar, and was eventually seen by more than 500.000 viewers. Earlier in 2010, Dragičević was cast as Buka Salom in the RTS series The Scent of Rain in the Balkans, the television adaptation of the novel of the same name by Gordana Kuić, directed by Ljubiša Samardžić. It began airing on 10 December 2010 and ended on 11 March 2011.

In 2011, Dragičević appeared in the music video for single "Slučajno" by Kiki Lesendrić, along with her Montevideo, God Bless You! fellow Miloš Biković. She is currently starring several plays in the Vuk Karadžić and the Boško Buha Theatre. Dragičević would go on to appear in the RTS television series Vojna akademija (English: Military Academy) and its spin-off film Vojna akademija 2, the Montevideo, God Bless You! sequel See You in Montevideo and Bićemo prvaci sveta (English: We Will Be the World Champions). In 2013, Dragičević was one of the contestants in the first season of Tvoje lice zvuči poznato, the Serbian version of Your Face Sounds Familiar.

Her latest film project, Panama, has been selected to screen in the Special Screenings section at the 2015 Cannes Film Festival.

Filmography

References

External links 
 

1989 births
Living people
Actresses from Belgrade
Serbian female models
Serbian film actresses
Serbian stage actresses
Serbian television actresses
Serbian television personalities
University of Belgrade people
21st-century Serbian actresses